Baby M (born April 27, ??) is a Japanese pop singer and songwriter. She is currently under Avex Records Japan.

Profile
Early life
Born in Japan to British/South African and Japanese parents, M spent her early childhood in Nagasaki. At the age of 14 she moved to Philippines with her mother's charitable work.

Charitable work
Her mother Monica had a charitable foundation, Kapatiran Foundation, based in Manila to establish feeding centers and education programs for children in some of the poorest areas of the city. It was during visits to these centers with her mother and sister that Baby M felt she wanted to help in her own way. She decided her passion for singing was the best way she could help and started singing in the slums. This is where she was discovered by a Japanese producer. In 2000 she was dubbed "the bridge between Japan and the Philippines." She also, through her mother, supported children with HIV in South Africa.

Music Career
In 2000 Baby M released the independently produced It's Alright single to support the children in Muntinlupa, a particularly deprived suburb of Metro Manila, Philippines.

She officially debuted in 2002 as "Baby.M" under Universal Music Japan with the single Usual Girl, which was used in the intro for the Japanese television show, Pecola, and after the release of two singles with the label, one indie mini-album. Having worked with various South African and Japanese singers and rappers, she re-debuted in 2009/2010 under Rhythm Zone, Avex, one of Japan's biggest labels. In 2011 she signed with Universal Records Philippines under a license from Avex.

The "M" of her stage name makes reference to the three important "M's" of her life; Monica, her mother, Mary and Music.

In 2011 she was nominated and became the Music Goodwill Ambassador for Japan to South Africa.

Japanese discography

Albums

 [2010.06.30] Baby M Japan
 [2011.02.17] Baby M Philippines
 [2012.03.28] Love for All Japan
 [2016.8.31] Bhetnai garho bho......

Mini-albums
 [2010.03.03] Bhuti
 [2010.03.03] Baby M -Prologue EP-

Singles
 [2000.10.15] It's Alright Japan
 [2002.09.04] Usual Girl (as Baby.M)
 [2003.03.26] Baby love / Ai ga Tomaranai ~Turn It into Love~ (愛が止まらない) (as Baby.M)
 [2004.08.18] Make Off (indie) (as Baby.M)

Digital singles
 [2011.02.09] Tsutaetai ~one way road~ (伝えたい)
 [2011.03.23] Mata, Sakura no Shita de... (また、桜の下で・・・)
 [2011.08.03] Bokura ni Kibou wo (僕らに希望を)
 [2011.09.28] Sakura feat. Christian Bautista

Collaborations
 [2001.06.21] Dj Nahki - Panam (Fly, Girl, Fly (feat. Baby M))
 [2009.09.02] GTS - Majestic (#2 Last Chance (feat. Baby M)) (#1 iTunes)
 [2009.12.16] Dohzi-T - 4 ever (#9 Get Ready (feat. Baby M, Mandoza))
 [2010.03.10] Ryuha-R - Beginnings+ (#16 Goodbye To My Love (feat. Baby M, Mandoza))
 [2010.04.07] Ken the 390 - New Order (#3 THE DOOR (feat. COMA-CHI, Baby M))
 [2010.06.16] Atrie - The Moment of Sparkle (#5 Stand High (feat. Baby M))
 [2010.08.04] House Nation Beat 2010 (#10 GTS feat. Baby M - Last Chance)
 [2010.12.08] Aili - Future (#16 Umi no Mieru Machi (Aili thanx to Baby M))
 [2010.12.08] Urban Pop Disney (#9 Circle of Life)
 [2011.01.07] *Star Guitar (Louder, (feat. Baby M & Ohga))
 [2011.09.14] Seeda (Odokei, (feat. Baby M))

South African discography

Collaborations
 [2008.10.10] Mandoza - Ingwenya (#12 Good-Bye to My Love (feat. Baby M))
 [2010.05.10] Mandoza - Real Deal (Don't Forget (feat. Baby M))

References

External links
 Official Website

Japanese women pop singers
Japanese people of British descent
Japanese people of South African descent
Living people
People from Nagasaki
Musicians from Nagasaki Prefecture
Year of birth missing (living people)
21st-century Japanese singers
21st-century Japanese women singers